Balatonfüredi KSE is a Hungarian handball club, based in Balatonfüred, Hungary.

European record
As of 23 July 2019:

Matches
Balatonfüred score listed first. As of 23 July 2019''.

References

External links
 Official website
 Balatonfüredi KSE at eurohandball.com

Hungarian handball clubs in European handball